Hickory Nut Gorge State Trail is a unit of the North Carolina state park system in Rutherford, Buncombe, and Henderson Counties, North Carolina in the United States.  The State Trail is planned as a continuous loop for hikers around Hickory Nut Gorge.  The trail is a collaboration between local governments and the state, with development coordinated by the North Carolina Division of Parks and Recreation (NCDPR).

History
In 2005, the General Assembly of North Carolina established Hickory Nut Gorge State Park near the Town of Lake Lure. Later that year, the Carolina Mountain Land Conservancy (now named Conserving Carolina) and The Nature Conservancy assisted the state with the first acquisition of land for the park.

In 2007, the privately owned Chimney Rock Park was purchased by the state as an expansion for the park, and Hickory Nut Gorge State Park was renamed Chimney Rock State Park as a result.

During the master planning process for Chimney Rock State Park in 2011, a regional hiking trail network was proposed which would connect the various tracts of state park land, local parks and would loop around Lake Lure.

On June 15, 2015, the General Assembly formalized the proposed trail network by establishing Hickory Nut Gorge State Trail, and directed NCDPR to coordinate its development.

References

External links
 
 Chimney Rock State Park Master Plan
 Vision for a 130+ Mile Trail Network
 Ambitious Hickory Nut Gorge State Trail to link Fairview with Chimney Rock and Lake Lure

State parks of North Carolina
Protected areas of Buncombe County, North Carolina
Protected areas of Henderson County, North Carolina
Protected areas of Rutherford County, North Carolina
Protected areas established in 2017
Hiking trails in North Carolina
2017 establishments in North Carolina